Isa bin Salman bin Hamad Al Khalifa (3 June 1931 – 6 March 1999) was the first emir of Bahrain from 1961 until his death in 1999.

Born in Jasra, Bahrain, he became emir upon the death of his father, Salman bin Hamad Al Khalifa.

Early life and reign

Isa was born in Jasra to Salman bin Hamad Al Khalifa and Mouza bint Hamad Al Khalifa (1933-2009), the daughter of Hamad ibn Abdullah  Al Khalifa, and succeeded his father as emir upon his death in November 1961. He was installed in 16 December.

Isa visited Ayetollah Mohsin Al Hakim in Najaf in 1968 to indicate his keenness to reinforce relationships with the Shia.

During his reign, Bahrain gained independence from the United Kingdom in 1971. While the government initially considered joining the United Arab Emirates, Isa had his country withdraw (along with Qatar) over his dissatisfaction with the proposed constitution . He then attempted to introduce a moderate form of parliamentary democracy, and men (though not women) were given the vote in parliamentary elections in 1973. In August 1975, however, he dissolved Parliament because it refused to pass the government-sponsored State Security Law of 1974. The parliamentary system was never restored in his lifetime and forced the emir to contend with occasional protests from the leftist and Islamist camps, which reached their peak in 1994 (see: History of Bahrain). 

During his reign there was an arrangement between him and his brother, Sheikh Khalifa bin Salman, whereby the Emir was assigned a diplomatic and ceremonial role, while Khalifa controlled the government and economy as Prime Minister.

Isa was one of the founders of the Dar Al Maal Al Islami Trust which was initiated by Saudi royal Mohammed bin Faisal Al Saud, King Faisal's son, in 1981.

Marriage and children

Isa bin Salman Al Khalifa had one wife, his cousin Sheikha Hessa bint Salman Al Khalifa (1933–2009), daughter of Salman bin Ibrahim Al Khalifa. They married on 8 May 1949. They had five sons and four daughters:

 Hamad bin Isa (1950-), current king
 Rashed bin Isa (-17 December 2011)
 Mohamed bin Isa, Commander of the National Guard (1997-2008)
 Abdullah bin Isa, Vice President of the Higher Committee for the Horseback riding club
 Ali bin Isa, Minister of the Royal Court Affairs (1955-)
 Munira bint Isa
 Maryam bint Isa
 Shaikha bint Isa
 Noura bint Isa

Legacy and death
During his 38 years as Emir, the economic transformation of Bahrain into a modern nation and a key financial center in the Persian Gulf area took place. Nevertheless, critics note that he also dissolved Parliament, taking on absolute power.

Isa bin Salman Al Khalifa died of a heart attack on 6 March 1999 at the Government House in Manama, shortly after a meeting with the United States defense secretary William Cohen. He was 67. The last function he attended was the funeral of King Hussein, which took place less than a month before his death.

US President Bill Clinton expressed "deep sadness", as did Graham at the news of the emir's death calling him "a good friend of peace." UN Secretary-General Kofi Annan also expressed "great sadness," and described the emir as "a force for stability" in the region. He was buried at the Al-Rifa'a cemetery. 

He was succeeded by his eldest son, Hamad bin Isa Al Khalifa.

Foreign honors

 : Grand Collar of the Order of Isabella the Catholic (4 December 1981)
 : Grand Collar of the Order of the Nile
 : Grand Cross of the National Order of the Legion of Honor
 : Grand Cross of the Order of Merit of the Federal Republic of Germany
 : Grand Collar of the Order of Pahlavi
 :
 Order of the Two Rivers 1st Class (x/5/1968, 2nd Class 3 April 1952)
 King Faisal II Installation Medal (2 May 1953)
 : 
 Grand Cordon with Collar of the Order of al-Hussein bin Ali 
 Grand Cordon of the Supreme Order of the Renaissance
 : Collar of the Order of Mubarak the Great of Kuwait
 : Grand Cordon of the Order of the Cedar (2nd Class, 1958)
 : Collar of the Order of Muhammad
 : Civil Order of Oman, 1st Class
 : Collar of the Order of the Independence of the State
 : Grand Cross of the Order of Good Hope (1995)
 Grand Cross of the Order of Umayyad
 : Grand Cross of the Order of the Independence
 : Order of Al-Nahayyan 1st Class 
 Empire of Iran : Commemorative Medal of the 2500th Anniversary of the founding of the Persian Empire (14 October 1971).
 :
 Honorary Knight Commander (KCMG, 14 July 1964) and Honorary Knight Grand Cross (GCMG, 15 February 1979) of the Order of St Michael and St George
 Honorary Knight Grand Cross of the Order of the Bath (GCB, 10 April 1984) 
 Queen Elizabeth II Coronation Medal (2 June 1953)

Titles 
1933–1942: Sheikh Isa bin Salman Al Khalifa
1942–1961: His Excellency Sheikh Isa bin Salman Al Khalifa
1961–1964: His Highness Sheikh Isa II bin Salman Al Khalifa, Hakim of Bahrain
1964–1971: His Highness Sheikh Sir Isa II bin Salman Al Khalifa, Hakim of Bahrain, KCMG
1971–1999: His Highness Sheikh Isa II bin Salman Al Khalifa, Emir of Bahrain

See also 
1990s uprising in Bahrain
Al Khalifa

References

External links

 

1931 births
1999 deaths
People from the Northern Governorate
Bahraini monarchs
Isa bin Salman
Muslim monarchs

Grand Croix of the Légion d'honneur
Honorary Knights Grand Cross of the Order of St Michael and St George
Honorary Knights Grand Cross of the Order of the Bath
Grand Cordons of the National Order of the Cedar
Collars of the Order of Isabella the Catholic
Grand Crosses Special Class of the Order of Merit of the Federal Republic of Germany
20th-century Bahraini people